Roman Catholic High School of Philadelphia, often referred to as Roman Catholic or just Roman, was founded by Thomas E. Cahill in 1890 as the first free Diocesan Catholic high school for boys in the nation. The school is located at the intersection of Broad and Vine Streets in Center City Philadelphia. It is managed by the Archdiocese of Philadelphia.

History 

Roman Catholic High School was founded with funding provided by the estate of Thomas E. Cahill, a 19th-century Philadelphia merchant. Cahill had envisioned the need to create a school that offered a free Catholic education for boys past their grammar school years. Cahill died before seeing that vision come to life. However, those wishes were followed and guided by a written will and his wife, Sophia Cahill.  Roman Catholic opened its doors in 1890 and offered free education to boys. Due to increased staff and facilities costs, free admission to the school ended in the 1960s.

Founder 
Thomas E. Cahill, born May 27, 1828, was the son of Thomas Cahill, a native of County Louth, Ireland, colloquially known as 'the Wee County' who came to America in 1817, and of Maria Elliott, daughter of one of the oldest colonial families of Delaware. His father was a railroad contractor who suffered heavy reverses in his business. His mother died at the age of 36. Thomas left school to do his share towards the support of a large family. At 17, he opened a little store in Philadelphia, located between Pine and Spruce Street on 26th at a wharf on the Schuylkill River.

Successful from the start, he embarked in the wood, coal, and ice business with the proceeds of his first venture. He later organized the Cold Spring Ice and Coal Company. In 1854 he became the first president. In 1869 he effected a consolidation of the large ice firms of the city,  incorporated under the name of the famous brand Knickerbocker Ice Company.

History

19th century

Main Building-Original 

Dedicated on September 6, 1890, the school's original building property established the main entrance on the frontage of North Broad Street. The building's length was 140 feet and extended eastward on Vine Street for 115 feet, bordered on the north by the very narrow Pearl Street and bounded eastward by a ten-foot wide alley commonly known as Watts Street, rededicated to the school. The land was formerly a Railroad Depot moved just north to Cahowhill Street. The exterior is a three-story building of Victorian Gothic design, faced with "Lee, Massachusetts" marble (the same as selected for Philadelphia City Hall), placed on a granite base (quarried from Conshohocken, Pennsylvania) and sited to impact majestically at the intersection by prominent architect Edwin Forrest Durang.  The building has two ornamental stone facades along Vine and Broad Streets joined at a square corner tower and two brick facades at the rear of the building. The building originally had a 150-foot marble tower topped in copper at the corner of Board and Vine, destroyed by fire in 1959 and not replaced.

Initially, there were 20 classrooms, each designed to accommodate between 24 and 42 pupils, the building contained offices, a library suite, mechanical arts workshops, and on the third floor, a hall with a 700-person seating capacity, a gymnasium, and studios with natural lighting for drawing and modeling. External fire towers provided access to lavatory facilities, but no provision was made for a lunchroom. The tower, not entirely ornamental, was fitted with instruments for astronomy classes.

Historically Certified in 1986 by the Historical Commission, it is classified as Gothic Revival architecture and consistent with a number of important Catholic churches and institutions in the City.

When Roman Catholic High School was dedicated on September 6, 1890, 105 boys were selected for entrance into the new high school. Later only 26 students survived economic hardships and became members of the first graduating class in 1894. Compared to the number who began as first-year students, the percentage of graduates was a little less than 25%. In 1928, one-half of those started received diplomas. During the 95 years of its opening, 16,228 students graduated from Catholic High.

20th century
In 1985, the Archdiocese slated the school for closing due to lowering enrollment. However, the school's alumni association, with the blessing of Philadelphia's John Cardinal Krol, embarked on a campaign to save the school. Roman's Alumni Association, which had existed for over 70 years, came together to raise funds and increase enrollment. The rector of the school even applied to have the building itself kept as a historic landmark, which was accepted. The significance of the historic landmark designation means the building on the corner of Broad and Vine Streets can never legally be torn down. Also, its exterior must always stay the same — though it does not have to remain a school.

21st century
Before 1986, students who attended Roman were from "feeder parishes"; Roman served as the school for the boys from the Center City, Chinatown, East Falls, Fairmount, Manayunk, North Philadelphia, and Roxborough regions of Philadelphia.

Roman enrolls boys from almost every Philadelphia neighborhood, including The Near and Far Northeast, West Philadelphia, Fishtown, Port Richmond, Mayfair, South Philly, New Jersey, Fox Chase, Roxborough, and the outlying suburbs.

Roman Catholic High School was built to hold about 750 to 800 students. However, because of high demand, it is above capacity and holds closer to 1100. The school holds an entrance test to select its students every October, November, and December. Of the 600 or 700 students that apply, only about 300 to 350 will be accepted. Students who do well on these tests also may receive scholarships ranging from a few hundred dollars to as much as $4000 a year. Usually, about 40 students receive scholarships.

Like other high schools, Roman has a tracking system: that is, the first track (also called the honors track), the second track, and the third track. Roman, however, is unique in that it tracks its honors class into three classes. While students in the honors classes learn the same material at the same pace, it creates a better learning system to have students of the same level together.

21st century
Beginning with the 2012–2013 school year, Roman announced the implementation of a 1:1 iPad initiative, starting with the incoming first-year students. Due to the ever-changing face of education, students require different tools and strategies. The initiative will allow students and teachers to individualize and differentiate instruction in a familiar way to today's students. Students will work on essential 21st-century skill sets needed to meet state and national standards.

Sexual abuse scandal

In July 2011, Philadelphia magazine published an article by Robert Huber regarding the 2011 grand jury report, which documented new charges of child sexual abuse by priests active in the Archdiocese of Philadelphia. The article included the story of Joe, a 59-year-old who spoke of his abuse at the hands of Father McGuigan when in the ninth grade at Roman Catholic High School.

Historical marker

Dedicated: Tuesday, September 29, 2009. Location: E side of N Broad St., between Vine & Pearl, Philadelphia by the Historical Commission as referenced on the List of Pennsylvania state historical markers. 
Marker Text: Thomas E. Cahill "Entrepreneur and philanthropist who bequeathed the bulk of his estate to establish Roman Catholic High School for Boys, the first free Catholic high school in the US. Founded here in 1890, the school initiated a diocesan high school system that became a model throughout the nation. Coming from a poor immigrant family, Cahill sought to provide young men from similar backgrounds with the secondary education denied him."

Extracurricular activities

Athletics 

Roman Catholic has been prominent in the Philadelphia Catholic League in basketball since the League's inception, winning 30 championship games since 1920. In 2015, 2016, and 2018 Catholic High won the Philadelphia Catholic league Title (PCL), Philadelphia City Title (District XII), and Pennsylvania Boys Class AAAA (Large School) State Championship.

Roman has also succeeded football. In the 2006 playoffs, Roman finished with a strong 9–3 record while losing to La Salle in the second round of the Catholic League playoffs. In 2007, Roman defeated Northeast Catholic and Father Judge en route to winning the Catholic League Championship, 10–9 over St. Joseph's Prep. This was Roman's best record ever at 12–2. This marks the team's second Red Division championship since the inception of the new Catholic League format, which began in 1999 and ended in 2007.

Roman Catholic H.S. also has a rivalry with the public high school Roxborough High. This rivalry has started an annual Thanksgiving Day football game; a game Roman Catholic has beaten Roxborough at for decades.

Boys Catholic High School is home to one of the most successful crews in North America, practicing for over ten months a year. Roman's crew team sculls (using two oars per man while rowing) rather than sweeps (using one oar a man while rowing). Recently it contributed a Lightweight Four to the Philadelphia Catholic League Rowing championships, finishing second in 2005 to Monsignor Bonner High School by six-tenths of a second. Roman's major sculling rivals are The Haverford School, Conestoga High School, and Malvern Preparatory School. In 2003 and 2005, two Roman students represented the United States at the Junior World Championships in Athens, Greece, & Brandenburg, Germany. In 2006, 2010, 2012, and 2016 the team won the Philadelphia Catholic League Championship.

The school's golf team has enjoyed many years of success as one of the top teams in the league.

The school's ice hockey team started in 1993. Since then, they have won 4 championships; 2000, 2002, 2010, and 2013.

The school's baseball team has won two Catholic League Championships; in 1978 and 1992. The 1992 team had the best record in school history, finishing the season 15-1 (27-1 overall, losing only the final game of the regular season) after beating Bishop Kenrick in the Catholic League Championship game.

Campus 

The campus comprises four facilities, with the main building located on the northeast corner intersection of Broad and Vine Streets.

Main Building-East Wing 

In 1953 the original three-story building received an additional two-story wing along the eastside. It connected and integrated the exterior brick façade as part of the interior. The space was utilized for physics and biology labs and the cafeteria. in 1996 the school received permission form the Archdiocese to build a $3.5 million expansion to the school, which was funded by the many alumni, friends, and foundations who recognized the historical importance of sustaining a Catholic high school presence in Center City. This wing, which is dedicated as Renaissance Hall housed an expansion of the cafeteria, a new discipline office, one classroom, and an information center which housed the library, computer lab, and television studio (named after broadcaster John Facenda. an Alumni). Also during this project, the labs in the 1954 wing were completely gutted and remodeled with new technology, furniture, and equipment. The Library and Information Center was renovated in the summer of 2013 upgrading computers, copiers, printers and furniture named in honor of John and Mary McShain.

Annex Building
In 2006, the school opened an additional building acquired from the City which had historical significance related to the City's Medical Examiner. The 13th Street Annex was dedicated to James McSherry, an alumnus and benefactor to the school. This new facility housed a sports training center, creative art studio, a multi-purpose room and the alumni association offices.

Arts Building-Howard Center for the Arts 
As part of "A Vision of Promise” on May 30, 2017 the school held a breaking ground ceremony on an additional new building with anticipated completion sometime in 2018. The initial stage is the construction of a 40,000-square foot building. The arts center is named for Barry and Elayne Howard, longtime supporters and benefactors of Roman Catholic. 
This new expanded academic facility is located about a block away at 1212 Wood Street, and includes band rooms, instrument storage space, a computer-aided design lab, a digital photography studio, a piano lab, a small theater and an expansion for art programs. More additions to the school in the Vision of Promise are planned.

Notable alumni

Sports

1890–1950
John "Rube" Cashman, head men's basketball coach for Villanova from 1926–1929
Frank Schell (1899), Gold Medal American rower who competed in the 1904 Summer Olympics.
Charles McIlvaine (Hon. Diploma awarded 2014), Member & gold-medallist of the 1928 US Olympic rowing team.
Matt Guokas Sr. (1934), played for the Philadelphia Warriors 1947 championship team; father of Matt Guokas Jr.
Tom Conley (1928), football and basketball coach; captain of the 1930 Notre Dame Fighting Irish football team; pall-bearer for Knute Rockne.
Art McNally (1943), former Director of Officiating for the National Football League (NFL) (1968–90).

1951–1990 
Bob Schafer (1951), Villanova University player, NBA player.
Jim Katcavage (1952), 13-year NFL player with the New York Giants, 3 Pro Bowls.
William "Speedy" Morris (1960), famed Roman Catholic High School and La Salle University basketball coach.
Michael Bantom (1969), member of the 1972 Olympic Basketball team, NBA player, and later NBA executive.
Dallas Comegys (1983), DePaul University, an NBA basketball player.

1991–present 
Marvin Harrison (1991), NFL Hall of Fame Wide Receiver (2016)
Marc Jackson (1993), Temple University and NBA basketball player.
Lari Ketner (1995), University of Massachusetts Amherst and NBA basketball player.
Rasual Butler (1998), Selected by the Miami Heat with the 53rd pick of the 2002 NBA draft.
Eddie Griffin (2000), NCAA All-American at Seton Hall University, drafted by the Houston Rockets in the first round of the 2001 NBA Draft.
Scott Paxson (2001) former Penn State all conference defensive tackle.
Glenn Ochal (2004), US Olympian; 2012 Bronze medalist (4-man crew); 2016 member (8-man crew).
Brad Wanamaker (2007), NBA and Euroleague player; currently plays for the Boston Celtics 
Maalik Wayns (2009), NBA basketball player.
Will Fuller (2013), current wide receiver for the Miami Dolphins of the NFL
Tony Carr (2016), basketball player in the Israeli Premier Basketball League
Lamar Stevens (2016), NBA basketball player
Jalen Duren (2022), NBA basketball player

Government 
James P. McGranery (1914), United States Attorney General under President Harry S Truman
Daniel J. Terra (1927), United States' first and only Ambassador at Large for Cultural Affairs
Albert F. Sabo (1938), judge who presided over the Mumia Abu-Jamal murder case.
Raymond F. Lederer (1957) Pennsylvania House of Representatives   1974–1977 United States House of Representatives 1977–1981
Charles Hammock Member of the Pennsylvania House of Representatives
Eugene F. McGill Member of the Pennsylvania House of Representatives 1995-2006

Religion 
Peter Keenan Guilday (1901), monsignor, leading Catholic Church historian in US.
Joseph A. Pepe (1960), current bishop of the Diocese of Las Vegas.
Daniel E. Thomas (1977), current bishop of the Diocese of Toledo.
Michael Joseph Bransfield, former bishop of the Diocese of Wheeling-Charleston, permanently excluded from engaging in any form of public ministry in the Catholic church.

Entertainment
Joseph I. Breen (1906), American public relations agent; film censor (1934–54)
John Facenda (1933), radio and television broadcaster from the 1930s through the early 1980s.
Charles Fuller (1955), African American playwright and screenwriter won the 1982 Pulitzer Prize for A Soldier's Play, a story about racism in the military.
Larry Neal (1956), noted scholar of African American theater, professor at Yale University, and playwright who was a leader of the Black Arts Movement.

Rectors

 Msgr. Nevin F. Fisher (1890–1902)
 Msgr. Hugh T. Henry (1902–1919)
 Msgr. William P. McNally (1919–1933)
 Rev. Leo D. Burns (1933–1938)
 Rev. John A. Cartin (1938–1952)
 Msgr. James T. Dolan (1952–1966)
 Msgr. Charles V. Gallen (1966–1975)

 Rev. Edward Cahill (1975–1981)
 Rev. Richard J. McLoughlin (1981–1990)
 Msgr. Francis W. Beach `68 (1990–1997)
 Rev. Paul C. Brandt (1997–2006)
 Rev. Joseph W. Bongard `77 (2006–2010)
 Rev. John B. Flanagan (2010–2014)
 Rev. Joseph W. Bongard `77 (2014–Present)

See also

References
Notes

External links

Roman Catholic High School for Boys
Roman Catholic High School Alumni Association

Boys' schools in the United States
Roman Catholic secondary schools in Philadelphia
Roman Catholic Archdiocese of Philadelphia
Educational institutions established in 1890
1890 establishments in Pennsylvania
Callowhill, Philadelphia